Louisa Matthíasdóttir (February 20, 1917 – February 26, 2000) was an Icelandic-American painter.

Louisa was born in Reykjavík. From 1925 to 1937 she grew up in the famous Höfði house since her family resided there. She showed artistic ability at an early age, and studied first in Denmark and then under Marcel Gromaire in Paris. Her early paintings, dating from the late 1930s, established her as a leading figure in the Icelandic avant-garde community (many of whom met together in a house in Reykjavík called Unuhús). In these paintings, subjects are painted with a broad brush, emphasizing geometric form. According to Louisa, "it was around this time that I started to do my paintings in  one unbroken session". These paintings already show much of the character of Louisa's mature work, but are more subdued in color.

Her move to New York City in 1942 was followed by a period of study under Hans Hofmann, along with other painters including Robert De Niro, Sr. (father of the actor) and Jane Freilicher. In 1944 she married painter Leland Bell, and until Bell's death in 1991 they enjoyed a partnership of mutual support. Their daughter Temma was born in 1945.

During the mid-1940s, Louisa and Bell met Jean Hélion, whose figurative style may have influenced Louisa's use of outline in some of her paintings of this period, such as Leland and Temma (1948). Louisa 's first solo exhibition took place at Jane Street Gallery in New York in 1948. Louisa, Bell, and Temma visited Paris in 1951–52 where they frequently met with Hélion, who introduced them to Alberto Giacometti and Balthus.

While Louisa's work of the 1950s saw her introducing a painterly style of small, gestural brushstrokes and tonal gradations, during the 1960s she gradually abandoned tonality as her style became characterized by brisk execution and broad areas of forthright color.

The paintings of Louisa's final three decades include Icelandic landscapes, a series of self-portraits, and tabletop still-life arrangements. The landscapes often include charmingly stylized depictions of Icelandic horses and sheep. She was to remain an Icelandic citizen all her life, the physical characteristics of her native land informing her bold treatment of form and clarity of light. The poet John Ashbery described the result as the "flavor, both mellow and astringent, which no other painter gives us."

In 1996, Louisa was awarded the American-Scandinavian Foundation's Cultural Award, and in 1998 became a member of the American Academy of Arts and Letters. She died in Delhi, New York in 2000. Her work is represented in many public collections, including the Hirshhorn Museum and Sculpture Garden in Washington, D.C., the Art Institute of Chicago, and the Reykjavík Art Museum.

Exhibition 
 2011: From Unuhús to West 8th Street at Kjarvalstaðir, Reykjavík Art Museum

References

 Perl, Jed, ed. (1999). Louisa Matthiasdottir. New York: Hudson Hills  Press.

External links
 louisamatthiasdottir.com

1917 births
2000 deaths
Louisa Matthiasdottir
Modern painters
Louisa Matthiasdottir
Art Students League of New York alumni
Kansas City Art Institute alumni
20th-century American painters
20th-century Icelandic women artists
Icelandic women painters